Hans-Jürgen Burchardt is a German economist and social scientist. Since 2005 he is Full Professor of International and Intersocietal Relations at the University of Kassel. His main areas of teaching and research include North-South-Relations, commodity-, environmental and social regimes in an international perspective, SDGs, social inequality and wealth research, theory and politics of development and Latin America.

Career and research 

Between 1988 and 1996 Burchardt studied social science and economics at the universities of Freiburg, Havana and Bremen completing both diplomas with distinction. After he received his PhD 1997 in Bremen he worked as a lecturer at the University of Hannover, where he supervised several research projects and obtaining his habilitation (second PhD) in 2001 with a thesis on international social politics. Apart from several consulting activities (e.g. for the European Initiative for Democracy and Human Rights or the German Federal Ministry of Education and Research) Burchardt was in charge of a research project at the German Institute of Global and Area Studies(GIGA). Between 2004 and 2005 he was Professor of Political Science and head of the International Studies Program in Political Management at the University of Applied Sciences in Bremen. Since 2007 he is spokesman of the international graduate program Global Social Policies and Governance (GSP&G). From 2009 to 2015 he was a member of the board of directors of the International Center for Development and Decent Work (ICDD).

As a visiting professor, Burchardt taught and conducted research at the Institut Barcelona Estudis Internacionals (IBEI) at Rutgers University, at the Universidad de La Habana (UH) as well as at the Universidad Nacional de San Martin in Buenos Aires (UNSAM).

As of 2017, Burchardt is director of CALAS - Maria Sibylla Merian Center for Advanced Latin American Studies and director of the Latin American Research Center Centro de Estudios Latinoamericanos (CELA) at the University of Kassel.

In addition, Burchardt is since 2021 project leader within the BMBF-funded research network extractivism.de and, together with Rachid Ouaissa and Hannes Warnecke-Berger, conducts research on commodity extractivism in Latin America and the Maghreb. Within the project, the constellations, (inter-) national crisis potentials as well as the possibilities for change and the durability of the development and social model of raw material export are being investigated.

Major publications 

 ed.: (Post)colonialismo a prueba, Cuba, Puerto Rico y las Filipinas desde una perspectiva comparada. Gedisa, Mexiko 2021, . [Full text]
 with Osnaide Izquierdo Quintana: Trabajo decente y Sociedad: Cuba bajo la óptica de los estudios sociolaborales comparada. Editorial UH, Havana 2017, . [Full text]
 as ed. with Stefan Peters and Nico Weinmann: Entwicklungstheorie von heute – Entwicklungspolitik von morgen. Nomos, Baden-Baden 2017, .
 as ed. with Stefan Peters: Umwelt und Entwicklung in globaler Perspektive: Ressourcen – Konflikte – Degrowth. Campus Verlag, Frankfurt am Main 2017, .
 with Rafael Domínguez, Carlos Larrea and Stefan Peters: Nada dura para siempre:  Neo-extractivismo tras el boom de las materias primas. UASB-ICDD, Quito 2016, . [Full text]
 with Stefan Peters: Der Staat in globaler Perspektive. Zur Renaissance der Entwicklungsstaaten. Campus-Verlag, Frankfurt am Main 2015, .
 with Fernando Groisman: Desprotegidos y desiguales. ¿Hacia una nueva fisonomía social? Prometeo, Buenos Aires 2014, .
 with Olaf Kaltmeier and Rainer Öhlschläger: Urbane (T)Räume: Städte zwischen Kultur, Kommerz und Konflikt. Nomos, Baden-Baden 2014, .
 with Stefan Peters and Nico Weinmann: Arbeit in globaler Perspektive. Facetten informeller Beschäftigung. Campus Verlag, Frankfurt am Main 2013, .
 with Elisabeth Tuider and Rainer Öhlschläger: Frauen (und) Macht in Lateinamerika. Nomos, Baden-Baden 2013, .
 with Kristina Dietz and Rainer Öhlschläger: Umwelt und Entwicklung im 21. Jahrhundert – Impulse und Analysen aus Lateinamerika.  Nomos, Baden-Baden 2013, .
 with Anne Tittor and Nico Weinmann: Sozialpolitik in globaler Perspektive – Asien, Afrika und Lateinamerika. Campus Verlag, Frankfurt am Main 2012, .
 with Ingrid Wehr: Soziale Ungleichheiten in Lateinamerika. Nomos, Baden-Baden 2011, .
 Tiempos de cambio - Repensar América Latina, Ediciones Böll, El Salvador 2007, . [Full text]
 Nord-Süd-Beziehungen im Umbruch – Neue Perspektiven auf Staat und Demokratie in der Weltpolitik, Campus Verlag, Frankfurt am Main 2009, .
 Zeitenwende - Politik nach dem Neoliberalismus. Schmetterling-Verlag, Stuttgart 2004, .

References

  Sponsorship by the German Academic Exchange Service
  The Heinrich Böll Foundation informs about the its cooperation with the GSP&G (German)
  Interview with Hans-Jürgen Burchardt at Welt-Sichten (German)
  Interview published in the German nationwide newspaper Die Tageszeitung (German)

External links 
 Hans-Jürgen Burchardt, Department 05 Social Science, University of Kassel 
Hans-Jürgen Burchardt, CALAS Directory Board
Hans-Jürgen Burchardt, Centro de Estudios Latinoamericanos, University of Kassel
Hans-Jürgen Burchardt, Project extractivism.de

Living people
Academic staff of the University of Kassel
Year of birth missing (living people)
German economists